The governor of Vermont is the head of government of the U.S. state of Vermont. The officeholder is elected in even-numbered years by direct voting for a term of two years. Vermont and bordering New Hampshire are the only states to hold gubernatorial elections every two years, instead of every four as in the other 48 U.S. states.

There is no limit on the number of terms a Vermont governor can serve. If no candidate receives at least 50% plus one vote of all votes for governor cast in the election, the governor of Vermont is then elected by the state legislature. The incumbent Vermont governor is Republican Phil Scott. He was sworn in on January 5, 2017, becoming Vermont's 82nd governor.

Function

The governor's working offices are located in The Pavilion in the state capital of Montpelier, Vermont. The Governor's ceremonial office, used during the legislative session of the General Assembly, is located in the Vermont State House, also in Montpelier.

The Constitution of Vermont details the powers of the governor:
To commission or appoint all officers ("except where provision is, or shall be, otherwise made by law or this Frame of Government")
To fill all vacancies in office until the office can be filled in the manner directed by state constitution or by state law
To correspond with other States
To "transact business with officers of government, civil and military"
To "prepare such business as may appear necessary, to lay before the General Assembly.
To grant pardons and remit fines, except for cases of treason, in which the governor may only grant reprieves until the end of the next session of the General Assembly, and for cases of impeachment, in which the governor cannot grant either reprieves or pardons
To "take care that the laws be faithfully executed" and "expedite the execution of such measures as may be resolved upon by the General Assembly"
To "draw upon the Treasury for such sums as may be appropriated by the General Assembly"
To "lay embargoes, or prohibit the exportation of any commodity" for up to 30 days during a recess of the General Assembly
To "grant such licenses as shall be directed by law"
To call special sessions of the General Assembly when necessary
To be the "Captain-General and Commander-in-Chief" of the "forces of the State" (the Vermont State Guard and Vermont National Guard), although the governor cannot "command in person, in time of war, or insurrection, unless by the advice and consent of the Senate, and no longer than they shall approve thereof"

There is a separately-elected lieutenant governor of Vermont. The lieutenant governor becomes the new governor, if the incumbent governor dies, resigns or is removed (via impeachment) from office. The lieutenant governor is also the lieutenant-general of the "forces of the State."

Succession

See also
List of governors of Vermont

References

General

 Doyle, William T. "The Vermont Political Tradition and Those Who Helped Make It." Doyle Publisher: 1987. .
 Duffy, John J., et al. The Vermont Encyclopedia. University Press of New England: 2003. .
 Potash, P. Jeffrey, et al. Freedom and Unity: A History of Vermont. Vermont Historical Society: 2004. .

External links

Official website of the Governor of Vermont
Snelling Center for Government study and poll on the length of term of Vermont governors
Government of Vermont portal

Governor
Politics of Vermont
1791 establishments in Vermont